Huger is an unincorporated community in Berkeley County, South Carolina, United States. It is part of the Charleston–North Charleston–Summerville Metropolitan Statistical Area.  The ZIP Code for Huger is 29450.

The Cainhoy Historic District, Middleburg Plantation, Pompion Hill Chapel, Quinby Plantation House-Halidon Hill Plantation, and White Church are listed on the National Register of Historic Places.

References

Unincorporated communities in Berkeley County, South Carolina
Unincorporated communities in South Carolina
Charleston–North Charleston–Summerville metropolitan area